The 1975 LPGA Championship was the 21st LPGA Championship, held May 29 to June 1 at Pine Ridge Golf Course in Lutherville, Maryland, a suburb north of Baltimore.

Kathy Whitworth won her third LPGA Championship, a stroke ahead of defending champion  It was Whitworth's sixth and final major title.

Past champions in the field

Source:

Final leaderboard
Sunday, June 1, 1975

Source:

References

External links
Golf Observer leaderboard
Pine Ridge Golf Course

Women's PGA Championship
Golf in Maryland
LPGA Championship
LPGA Championship
LPGA Championship
LPGA Championship
LPGA Championship
Women's sports in Maryland